David Lawrence Levinthal (born March 8, 1949) is an American photographer who lives and works in New York City. He uses small toys and props with dramatic lighting to construct miniature environments for subject matters varying from war scenes to voyeurism to racial and political references to American pop culture.

Levinthal's major series include Hitler Moves East (1972–1975), Modern Romance (1983–1985), Wild West (1986–1989), Desire (1991–1992), Blackface (1995–1998), Barbie (1997–1998), Baseball (1998–2004), and History (2010–2018).

Biography
Levinthal was born in 1949 in San Francisco, California. He received a Scientiæ Magister in Management Science from the MIT Sloan School of Management (1981), an MFA in Photography from Yale University (1973), and a BA in Studio Art from Stanford University (1970). He was the recipient of a Guggenheim Fellowship from the John Simon Guggenheim Memorial Foundation in 1995 and a fellowship from the National Endowment for the Arts in 1990–1991.

He has had retrospective exhibitions of his work at the International Center of Photography and the George Eastman Museum. 

Levinthal has produced a diverse oeuvre, utilizing primarily large-format Polaroid photography. His works touch upon many aspects of American culture, from Barbie to baseball to X-rated dolls. Levinthal's major series include Hitler Moves East (1972–1975), Modern Romance (1983–1985), Wild West (1986–1989), Desire (1991–1992), Blackface (1995–1998), Barbie (1997–1998), Baseball (1998–2004), and History (2010–2018).

His politically charged series, Blackface, consists of close-ups of black memorabilia, household objects infused with African-American stereotypes, and caused such a controversy that the Institute of Contemporary Art of Philadelphia was forced to cancel the exhibition while still in its early planning stages. 

On his use of toys, Levinthal said that "Toys are intriguing, and I want to see what I can do with them. On a deeper level, they represent one way that society socializes its young." Furthermore, Levinthal is aware of the power of toys: “Ever since I began working with toys, I have been intrigued with the idea that these seemingly benign objects could take on such incredible power and personality simply by the way they were photographed. I began to realize that by carefully selecting the depth of field and making it narrow, I could create a sense of movement and reality that was in fact not there.

Books
 Hitler Moves East: A Graphic Chronicle, 1941–43 (Sheed, Andrews & McMeel, 1977). Published with Garry Trudeau.
 The Wild West (Smithsonian Institution, 1993). Text by Richard B. Woodward.
 Small Wonder: Worlds in a Box (Smithsonian Institution, 1995). Text by David Corey.
 Barbie Millicent Roberts (Pantheon, 1998). Text by Valerie Steele.
 Mein Kampf (Twin Palms, 1998). Texts by James Young, Roger Rosenblatt, and Gary Trudeau.
 Blackface (Arena Editions, 1999). Text by Manthia Diawara.
 XXX (Galerie Xippas, 2000). Text by Cecilia Andersson.
 David Levinthal: Modern Romance (St. Ann's, 2001). Text by Eugenia Parry.
 Netsuke (Galerie Xippas, 2004). Text by Eugenia Parry.
 David Levinthal: Work from 1975-1996 (International Center of Photography, 1997). Texts by Charles Stainback and Richard Woodward.
 Baseball (Empire, 2006). Text by Jonathan Mahler.
 I.E.D: War in Afghanistan and Iraq (powerHouse, 2009). Text by Levinthal.
 Bad Barbie (JMc & GHB Editions, 2009). Texts by Richard Prince and John McWhinnie.
 Hitler Moves East: A Graphic Chronicle, 1941-43: 35th Anniversary Edition (Andrews McMeel, 2013). Texts by Roger Rosenblatt and Garry Trudeau.
 War Games (Kehrer, 2013). Texts by Dave Hickey, Paul Roth, and Kaitlin Booher.
 History (Kehrer, 2015). Texts by Lisa Hostetler and Dave Hickey.
 War, Myth, Desire: Box Set (Kehrer, 2018). Texts by Lisa Hostetler, Joanna Marsh, Dave Hickey, Garry Trudeau, Levinthal, and Roger Rosenblatt.
 War, Myth, Desire (Kehrer, 2018). Texts by Lisa Hostetler, Joanna Marsh, Dave Hickey.

Collections
Levinthal's work is held in the following permanent public collections:
Art Institute of Chicago
Centre Pompidou in Paris
Corcoran Gallery of Art in Washington, D.C.
Los Angeles County Museum of Art
Metropolitan Museum of Art
Minneapolis Institute of Art
Museum of Modern Art
Whitney Museum of American Art in New York City.

References

External links

David Levinthal at Julie Nester Gallery
 David Levinthal photographs at New-York Historical Society

1949 births
Living people
Photographers from California
Photographers from New York (state)
MIT Sloan School of Management alumni
Fine art photographers
20th-century American photographers
21st-century American photographers